The Valsassina Ensemble Wien (also: Valsassina Ensemble) is an Austrian chamber orchestra. It was founded in Vienna, Austria by the Austrian-Mexican singer León de Castillo in 2012. The orchestra is focused on Austrian repertoire and on oeuvres of the 19th, 20th and 21st century.

History 
The Valsassina Ensemble was formed by León de Castillo who managed to put together several young colleagues of the University of Music and Performing Arts Vienna to "create a sound which is rather unusual as a steady accompaniment for a singer". His motivation is to establish musical independence. Their debut concert took place at the Diplomatic Academy of Vienna in March 2013. During their first two seasons, the young chamber orchestra performed their early concerts at the Wiener Konzerthaus, Wiener Musikverein, Schlosstheater Schönbrunn, at the Mexican State Opera Palacio de Bellas Artes, at the Sala Nezuahualcóyotl of the National Autonomous University of Mexico and at the New York Carnegie Hall among other renowned concert halls. 2021 the Ensemble made its debut at the Donauinselfest, which is the largest open-air music festival in the world, with around 3 million visitors over 3 days.

Etymology 
The name "Valsassina Ensemble Wien" was chosen in recognition of the regular rehearsals and recordings at the Thurn-Valsassina Palace in central Vienna. Thurn und Valsassina is an Austrian family of high-aristocratic heritage, originally from Friuli and Gorizia and whose name is derived from Valsassina, a valley which lies within the Province of Lecco.

Heinrich Schiff 
The cellist, conductor and former University Professor of the University of Music and Performing Arts Vienna Heinrich Schiff (1951–2016) prepared the Valsassina Ensemble during the seasons from 2013 to 2016 for their concerts. He welcomed the spirit of the chamber orchestra during rehearsals and empowered the initiative of the Ensemble, where many young artists came deliberately together to perform music.

Festival orchestra and conductors 
The Valsassina Ensemble is the Festival Orchestra of the Primavera Festival Wien. The main conductor is Bernhard Melbye Voss (Denmark). 

2021 former main conductor Marta Gardolinska (Poland)  was appointed as Music Director of the Opéra national de Lorraine and made her debut conducting the Los Angeles Philharmonic at the Hollywood Bowl.

Interdisciplinary projects 
The Valsassina ensemble focuses on interdisciplinary projects to build bridges between classical music and/or electronic music, alternative pop music, fine / visual arts, history and politics. For example, during their performances at the Diplomatic Academy of Vienna, a theatre play about photographer Erich Lessing took place in different panels in combination with classical music. Furthermore, the Ensemble cooperated with the contemporary composer Gavin Gamboa (*1985) and the artist collective Teaching Machine (Los Angeles) to initiate a project about Georg Friedrich Händel, Johann Sebastian Bach and Domenico Scarlatti melded with electronic music and visual art.

On the occasion of the 280th anniversary of Antonio Vivaldi's death, the Viennese chamber orchestra organized in summer 2021 a interdisciplinary multimedia project referring to the number 4 at the viennese Karlskirche titled IV Viertual Dimensional Reality. The project included projections on one of the biggest churches in Vienna as the performance of The Four Seasons near Antonio Vivaldis grave.

References 

Chamber orchestras
Musical groups established in 2012
2012 establishments in Austria
Musical groups from Vienna
Austrian orchestras